Zera Yacob (28 August 1599 – 1692) was an Ethiopian philosopher from the city of Aksum in the 17th century. His 1667 treatise, developed around 1630 and known in the original Ge'ez language as the Hatata (Inquiry), has been compared to René Descartes' Discours de la méthode (1637).

For centuries, Ge'ez texts had been written in Ethiopia. Around 1510, Abba Mikael translated and adapted the Arabic Book of the Wise Philosophers, a collection of sayings from the early Greek Pre-Socratics, Plato, and Aristotle via the neo-Platonic dialogues, also influenced by Arab philosophy and the Ethiopian discussions.

Zera Yacob's Inquiry goes further than these former texts, as he argues in following one's natural reasoning instead of believing what one is told by others. He was a contemporary of the female activist Walatta Petros, whose biography was written in 1672.

Biography

Yacob was born into a farmer family near Aksum in northern Ethiopia, the former capital of Ethiopia under the ancient Kingdom of Aksum. Yacob's name means "The Seed of Jacob" ("Zar" is the Ge'ez word for "seed"). Although his father was poor, he supported Yacob's attendance of traditional schools, where he became acquainted with the Psalms of David and educated in the Ethiopian Orthodox Christian faith. He was denounced before Emperor Susenyos (r. 1607–1632), who had turned to the Roman Catholic faith and ordered his subjects to follow his own example.

Refusing to adopt the Catholic faith, Yacob fled into exile with some gold and the Book of Psalms. On the road to Shewa in the south, he found a cave at the foot of the Tekezé River and lived in it as a hermit for two years, praying and developing his philosophy. He wrote of his experience, "I have learnt more while living alone in a cave than when I was living with scholars. What I wrote in this book is very little; but in my cave I have meditated on many other such things."

After the death of the Emperor, Susenyos's son Fasiledes (r. 1632–1667), a firm adherent of the Ethiopian Oriental Orthodox Church, took power, expelling the Jesuits, and extirpated the Catholic faith in his kingdom in 1633. Yacob left his cave and settled in Emfraz. He found a patron, a rich merchant named Habta Egziabher (known as Habtu), and married a maid of the family. He refused to live as a monk and stated that "the law of Christians which propounds the superiority of monastic life over marriage is false and can’t come from God." However, he also rejected polygamy because "the law of creation orders one man to marry one woman."

Yacob became the teacher of Habtu's two sons, and at the request of his patron's son Walda Heywat, Yacob wrote his famous 1667 treatise investigating the light of reason. Little is known of Yacob's later life. However, it is believed that he lived a fulfilled family life in Emfraz, and remained there for the next 25 years. He died there in 1692. Yacob's year of death was recorded by Walda Heywat in an annotation to the Treatise.

Authorship controversy 
The authorship of the Hatata was challenged by Carlo Conti Rossini in 1920, who claimed it was forged by father Giusto d'Urbino, an Italian scholar who worked in Ethiopia. The arguments are extrinsic, based on the manuscripts' recent age, his knowledge of Ethiopic language and culture, the information on Islam also being known by d'Urbino, and the fact that he discovered the two extant manuscripts. In 1934, Eugen Mittwoch put forward linguistic arguments for the inauthentic nature of the Hatata, and scholarly interest in the work waned. Amsalu Aklilu and Ato Alemayyehu Moges argued for the authenticity of the work, based on its nonreligious contents, sentence structure, and the particularity of the Ge'ez used. Claude Sumner wrote in favor of the Inquiry's authenticity in 1976 with statistical evidence showing the duality of authors in their differing Biblical quotations, using five newly found letters of d'Urbino in Rome. Sumner also argued that his knowledge of Ge'ez was worse than originally presented, and that he did not share the ideas of the Hatata at the time he was supposed to have written it.

Philosophical work
Yacob is most noted for this ethical philosophy surrounding the principle of harmony. He proposed that an action's morality is decided by whether it advances or degrades overall harmony in the world. While he did believe in a deity, whom he referred to as God, he rejected any set of particular religious beliefs. Rather than deriving beliefs from any organized religion, Yacob sought the truth in observing the natural world. In Hatata, Yacob applied the idea of a first cause to produce a proof for the existence of God, thus proposing a cosmological argument in chapter 3 of Hatata: "If I say that my father and my mother created me, then I must search for the creator of my parents and of the parents of my parents until they arrive at the first who were not created as we [are] but who came into this world in some other way without being generated." However, the knowability of God does not depend on human intellect, but "Our soul has the power of having the concept of God and of seeing him mentally. God did not give this power purposelessly; as he gave the power, so did he give the reality." He argued too against discrimination, predating John Locke by decades, in chapter 6 of Hatata, starting the chapter with: 
"All men are equal in the presence of God; and all are intelligent since they are his creatures; he did not assign one people for life, another for death, one for mercy, another for judgment. Our reason teaches us that this sort of discrimination cannot exist."

In chapter 5 of Hatata, he criticizes the religious argument for slavery saying, "what the Gospel says on this subject cannot come from God. Likewise, the Mohammedans said that it is right to go and buy a man as if he were an animal. But with our intelligence, we understand that this Mohammedan law cannot come from the creator of man who made us equal, like brothers, so that we call our creator our father." At the time, slavery was widely practiced in Ethiopia.

See also
Walda Heywat, his successor

References

Further reading
 Teodros Kiros, "Zera Yacob and Traditional Ethiopian Philosophy," in Wiredu and Abraham, eds., A Companion to African Philosophy, 2004.
 Enno Littmann. Philosophi Abessini. Corpus Scriptorum Christianorum Orientalium, Vol. 18, Scriptores Aethiopici, Presses Républicaines, 1904. Contains the Ge'ez text of Zera Yacob's treatise.
 Claude Sumner, Ethiopian Philosophy, vol. II: The Treatise of Zara Yaecob and Walda Hewat: Text and Authorship, Commercial Printing Press, 1976.
 Claude Sumner, Ethiopian Philosophy, vol. III: The Treatise of Zara Yaecob and Walda Hewat: An Analysis, Commercial Printing Press, 1978. 
 Claude Sumner, "The Light and the Shadow: Zera Yacob and Walda Heywat: Two Ethiopian Philosophers of the Seventeenth Century," in Wiredu and Abraham, eds., A Companion to African Philosophy, 2004.

External links
 Brendan Ritchie, "Ethiopian Philosophy: A Brief Introduction with Bibliography and Selections"
 Dag Herbjørnsrud, "The African Enlightenment," AEON, 13 December 2017
 Ethiopian Philosophy - A blog with commentary on Zera Yacob's treatise.

1599 births
1692 deaths
17th-century Ethiopian people
17th-century philosophers
Religion in Ethiopia
Ethiopian writers
Ethiopian philosophers
Enlightenment philosophers
People from Tigray Region
Africana philosophy
Deist philosophers